Tateomys is a genus of rodent from Sulawesi. Both species have been classified as vulnerable by IUCN. It includes the following species:

Long-tailed shrew rat – Tateomys macrocercus Musser, 1982  
Tate's shrew rat – Tateomys rhinogradoides Musser, 1969

References

 
Rodents of Sulawesi
Rodent genera
Taxa named by Guy Musser